The 1959 Cal Poly Pomona Broncos football team represented the Cal Poly Kellogg-Voorhis Unit—now known as California State Polytechnic University, Pomona—as an independent during the 1959 NCAA College Division football season. Led by third-year head coach Don Warhurst, Cal Poly Pomona compiled a record of 7–1–1. The team outscored its opponents 231 to 96 for the season. The Broncos played home games at Pomona Catholic High School in Pomona, California.

Schedule

Team players in the NFL/AFL
No Cal Poly Pomona players were selected in the 1960 NFL Draft.

The following finished their Cal Poly Pomona career in 1959, were not drafted, but played in the NFL/AFL.

Notes

References

Cal Poly Pomona
Cal Poly Pomona Broncos football seasons
Cal Poly Pomona Broncos football